Fireman is a 2015 Indian Malayalam-language disaster film directed by Deepu Karunakaran and produced by Milan Jaleel under the banner of Galaxy Films.It film shooting is completed on one day
 It stars Mammootty, Unni Mukundan, Siddique and Nyla Usha in the lead roles. The music is composed by Rahul Raj.

Plot
The movie starts off with Narendan Achari  at a shop with his daughter who has been treated for a brain tumour. He is distracted for some time during which his daughter goes missing. In a frenzy he rushes to the nearest police station but is frustrated at their lack of efforts at finding her.

Same day, fire man Lakshmanan Pillai  has his send off from service. Later Achari is seen driving away in his car and causing an accident making an LPG tanker topple on the road. There are casualties and the police and the fire force arrive and try to contain the situation. However, the tanker springs a leak and a police officer inadvertently causes an explosion despite Pillai's best efforts to thwart this. Pillai is wounded in the ensuing explosion destroying his lower body. Fire man Vijay  appears heroically to the scene and takes over the reins of averting the disaster. Vijay and the police force clashes as to what action plan to take. Later Vijay is given full reins of the project. Some time later Achari appears and threatens to light up the area if his daughter is not found within two hours. Vijay tries to calm him, blaming the police for humiliating him. Later, residents at jail learn of the gas leak and shout to get out. The police with the help of Iqbal calms them. After some time the tanker moves due to the pressure bounding, due to this the refinery technicians could check the tanker. Vijay stops it by decreasing its pressure to 60 cubic volume before it could blast.

A refinery technician who checks the tanker finds that the screws were not properly connected to the truck. Simultaneously the police gets information that the tanker drivers have gone missing. Vijay predicts that the tanker accident was pre planned by a man identified as Achari, to break his criminal friend out of the central jail.
However the force is left with no option but to vacate the jail. After a series of events, Vijay locks himself in jail in order to find out who the wannabe free prisoner is, and finds the culprit successfully. He also instructs his unit to refill the LPG in the tanker to a new tanker, thus thwarting a major disaster.
Next day, Vijay and his team, who are supposed to attend the funeral of their dear colleagues, get an emergency call and decide to thwart the accident. As the hero says, a commoner dialling 101 believes that a fireman would come in any problem to save him.

Cast

Production
On 4 September 2014 it was reported that Mammootty would play a firefighter in a movie directed by Deepu Karunakaran. Deepu initially approached Mohanlal for protagonist, he liked the script and suggested some changes in the screenplay, but after the revised screenplay Deepu had to wait 2 years for his dates. So he decided to cast Prithviraj but the fate was the same. Finally he offered the role to Mammootty, who already knew the story from Mohanlal and the revision he made. Initial reports stated Andrea Jeremiah and Nyla Usha are in the film, but not as Mammootty's pair. On 1 November 2014 Unni Mukundan confirmed about his role through Facebook. Movie planned to start its shoot by the third of October at Ernakulam, but started rolling on 20 October 2014 at Palakkad. The first look poster released on 26 November 2014 followed by a second one on 29 November 2014 through Mammootty's official Facebook page.

Release
The film was released on 19 February 2015.

Critical Reception
The film received highly positive reviews from the critics. Deepa Soman writing for The Times of India rated the film 3.5 out of 5 and said, "The movie keeps you on the edge of the seat throughout and there is no dull moment. The freshness of the subject and its intention in recognizing the tribe of firemen is commendable," and she appreciated Mammootty for his performance as a fireman. Tony Mathew of Malayala Manorama wrote: "There was no hype; neither were the expectations high. Still it has all elements in place to keep the critics quiet, satiate the fans and common audience alike in the days ahead." He concluded the review saying, "Firefighters are supposed to douse the flames that eat everything it comes across, but this 'Fireman' will set fire to theatres for sure." Veeyen of Nowrunning.com stated that Fireman was a tribute to firefighters and that the film was "fairly good." Applauding the film's cast and performances, direction, cinematography, editing and score, but criticising the graphics works and the incompleteness in screenplay, Akhila Menon of Filmibeat.com gave a rating 2.5 out of 5 and wrote a verdict, "Kudos to team for materialising India's first fire force based movie. Overall, a partially accomplished mission." A reviewer of Indiaglitz.com said that "opens to a very shaky start" it has an  engaging storyline and it is " one of the well made thrillers in recent Malayalam."

Pramod Thomas of The New Indian Express however said, "The movie throws cold water on the fire of expectations of an average spectator. The bland screenplay of the movie isn't helping either. The only saving grace of the film is that it tells a hitherto untold story of the heroics of firemen and deserves a salute for the same."

Box Office
This movie was Super Hit in malayalam box office.

References

External links
 

2015 films
2010s Malayalam-language films
Fictional portrayals of the Kerala Police
Films shot in Palakkad
Films shot in Kochi
Indian disaster films